The scarlet-horned manakin (Ceratopipra cornuta) is a species of bird in the family Pipridae.

It is found in Venezuela and adjacent Guyana and northern Brazil. Its natural habitat is subtropical or tropical moist montane forest.

References

External links
 Image and classification at Animal Diversity Web

scarlet-horned manakin
Birds of Venezuela
scarlet-horned manakin
Taxonomy articles created by Polbot